York University Faculty of Health was founded in 2006. Led by Dean Paul McDonald, it is based in Toronto, Ontario, Canada and is part of York University's campus of 50,000 students.

The Faculty of Health, with 9,000 undergraduate students, 800 graduate students and 400 faculty members offers six undergraduate programs: Health Studies (Policy, Management and Informatics), Kinesiology & Health Science, Nursing, Psychology, Neuroscience, and Global Health. Additionally, the Faculty has launched the Health Leadership and Learning Network, a continuing education unit focusing on various issues of interest including inter-professional care.

The Faculty is affiliated with Stong and Calumet Colleges. The current dean, Professor Paul W. McDonald, was appointed in May 2016. His term started on July 1, 2016 when he replaced the inaugural dean of ten years, Dr Harvey Skinner.

Internationally, the Faculty has collaborated with major institutions such as the Rajasthan University of Health Sciences in India, the Chongqing Public Health Bureau in China, and in the Middle East (e.g. Tel Aviv University, Al Quds University, Jordan University of Science and Technology).

Academic Units & Programs 

The Faculty of Health offers a range of undergraduate, graduate and certificate education programs, as well as engages in integrative basic science, applied research and knowledge mobilization. The academic units, two colleges and Health Leadership and Learning Network form the core of the Faculty of Health's integrated model for linking undergraduate, graduate and continuing education programs.

Department of Psychology offers courses taught by faculty who are largely internationally recognized scholars. There are also evening and summer programs designed for working students who wish to pursue their studies on a part-time basis, and a special program in rehabilitation administered jointly with Seneca. The undergraduate program offers BA and BSc degrees and the graduate program offers MA and PhD degrees.
School of Kinesiology &  Health Science offers an undergraduate program (BA and BSc) with two certificate programs in Athletic Therapy, and Fitness Assessment and Exercise Counseling. The MSc/PhD Graduate Program includes three specialization areas: Integrative Physiology, Neuroscience and Biomechanics and Health and Fitness Behaviours. The department was ranked 16th best in the world and 1st in Canada by ShanghaiRanking for 2017.
School of Nursing prepares nurses for practice (both entry to practice and advanced practice); and integrates knowledge into practice.  The teaching approach goes beyond the purely biomedical model to focus on the development of the theoretical, scientific and philosophical knowledge of human caring.  The School offers three BScN undergraduate degree programs: Collaborative Program with Seneca and Georgian Colleges, 2nd Entry, and the program for Internationally Educated Nurses.  Also, the School offers both online and blended learning versions of the Master of Science in Nursing (MScN). Planning is underway for a doctoral research training PhD program.
School of Health Policy & Management offers a Bachelor of Health Studies program with three honours majors: Health Policy, Health Management and Health Informatics with 90 credit programs in same; a Certificate in Health Informatics. At the graduate level, the school houses a unique MA/'PhD in Critical Disability Studies – the doctoral program is one of only two in North America (other at University of Illinois, Chicago). A distinctive interdisciplinary MA/PhD program began implementation in September 2009 with two initial fields: i) Health Policy and Equity; ii) Health Informatics and Decision Support.
 York's Global Health program is Canada’s first undergraduate global health degree. The program explores global health challenges such as chronic and communicable diseases, wealth disparity, environmental degradation, government policy and human rights.
 The Neuroscience program is jointly offered by the Faculty of Health and Faculty of Science and investigates the development, structure, and function of the brain and nervous system.
Health Leadership & Learning Network is the Faculty's unit for continuing education and professional development, offering customized and open learning opportunities, convening, networking programs and consulting activities.

The Faculty of Health is associated with Stong College and Calumet College.

Notable faculty 
Harvey Skinner, former Dean Faculty of Health
Ellen Bialystok, Distinguished Research Professor, Psychology
James Orbinski, Professor, School of Health Policy & Management and Director, Dahdaleh Institute for Global Health Research
Debra Pepler, Distinguished Research Professor, Psychology
Dennis Raphael, Professor, Health Policy & Management
Rebecca Pillai Riddell, Professor, Psychology
Steven Hoffman, Professor, School of Health Policy & Management and Osgoode Hall Law School
Lauren Sergio, Professor, Kinesiology & Health Science
Michael Riddell, Professor, Kinesiology & Health Science
David Hood, Professor, Kinesiology & Health Science
Gordon Flett, Professor, Psychology
Shahirose Premji, Professor, Nursing
Laurence Harris, Professor, Psychology and Director, Centre for Vision Research
Joel Lexchin, Professor Emeritus, Health Policy & Management

References

External links
Official website

Health
2006 establishments in Ontario
Educational institutions established in 2006